Menthyl isovalerate, also known as validolum, is the menthyl ester of isovaleric acid. It is a transparent oily, colorless liquid with a smell of menthol. It is very slightly soluble in ethanol, while practically insoluble in water. It is used as a food additive for flavor and fragrance. It is produced by typical esterification procedures with usual catalysts such as HCl or H2SO4, and is rather slow, usually done for 20+hr at 100°C or a bit higher. Validol, the anxiety medication containing a roughly 25% solution of menthol in menthyl isovalerate is prepared essentially in one step, in which the amount of menthol added before conducting the acid catalysed esterification is in an excess such that the resulting solution of the yielded ester has around 25% menthol, simplifying the procedure. Work up might consist of several washings, including one with aqueous sodium bicarbonate to neutralize traces of acid catalyst and unreacted isovaleric acid, and distillation.

Medical use
In Poland, Bulgaria, and the former Soviet Union states including Russia, menthyl isovalerate mixed with roughly 25% menthol is sold as an anxiolytic under various trade names  including Validol, Valofin, and Menthoval.

See also
 Methyl pentanoate
 Hopantenic acid
 Isovaleramide

References

GABA analogues
GABAA receptor positive allosteric modulators
Anxiolytics
Sedatives
Russian drugs
Isovalerate esters
Isopropyl compounds